Broadening top (a.k.a. a megaphone pattern) is technical analysis chart pattern describing trends of stocks, commodities, currencies, and other assets. Broadening Top formation appears much more frequently at tops than at bottoms. Its formation usually has bearish implications.  

It is a common saying that smart money is out of market in such formation and market is out of control.  In its formation, most of the selling is completed in the early stage by big players and the participation is from general public in the later stage.

Price and volume
Price keeps on swinging unpredictably and one can't be sure where the next swing will end.
Regarding the shares volume, it is very irregular and leaves no clue to the direction of the next move.

How broadening top is formed
In the broadening top formation five minor reversals are followed by a substantial decline.

In the figure above, price of the share reverses five times, reversal point d is made at a lower point than reversal point b and reversal point c and e occur successively higher than reversal point a.

One can't be sure of the trend unless price breaks down the lower of the two points (b & d) and keeps on falling. In the figure below, Broading Top is confirmed.

Other chart patterns 
 Candlestick pattern
 Double top and double bottom
 Gap (chart pattern)
 Head and shoulders top and bottom
 Island reversal
 Triple top and triple bottom
 Wedge pattern

See also
 Acquisitions, mergers, and takeovers terminology

References

Chart patterns